The Bulgarian Cricket Federation is the official governing body of the sport of cricket in Bulgaria. The Bulgarian Cricket Federation is Bulgarias's representative at the International Cricket Council and is an affiliate member and has been a member of that body since 2008. It is also a member of the European Cricket Council. The headquarters of Bulgarian Cricket Federation are at 1040 Sofia, Bulgaria.In 2017, became an associate member

History

The game of cricket was introduced into Bulgaria in the early 20th century by English diplomats and was played in the American college in the centre of Southwest Bulgaria – Blagoevgrad. The new history of Bulgarian cricket began in 2002 with the official foundation of the Bulgarian Cricket Federation with the efforts of a few enthusiastic sportsmen, captivated by the game. In June 2008 on its meeting, ICC granted Bulgaria with Affiliate status, and new doors opened for the development of cricket in the country. In 2009 BCF started a project for construction of a National Cricket Base located in the National Sports Academy, Sofia, which will be completed and official opened in September 2012 with hosting of the European T20 Cricket Tournament.

Constitution
For getting information on the constitution of Bulgarian Cricket Federation, click here.

References

External links
Official site of Bulgaria Cricket Federation
Correct address to official website
Cricinfo-Bulgaria

Cricket administration
Sports governing bodies in Bulgaria